The second season of Call Me Mother premiered on October 26, 2022. The cast was announced on September 23, 2022. All three drag mothers from the first season, Peppermint, Crystal and Barbada de Barbades, are returning; Farra N. Hyte is also returning as a non-mentoring judge, alongside new judge Landon Cider in place of the first season's Miss Butterfly.

The prize package for the winner includes a seven-night stay for two at the Almar Resort luxury LGBTQ+ beachfront experience in Puerto Vallarta, Mexico, courtesy of Air Canada Vacations, a year’s supply of Rimmel Cosmetics, a year’s supply of Wella Professionals hair product and the chance to be the Face of Wella Face at Pride Toronto, and a cash prize of $25,000, courtesy of Freddie.

The winner of the second season of Call Me Mother was Weebee, with Jessie Précieuse, Makayla Couture and Pepper as runners-up.

Contestants
Ages, names and cities stated are at time of filming.

Contestant progress
Legend:

Contestant notes
Makayla Couture previously appeared on the second season of Canada's Drag Race, as the makeover partner of Icesis Couture in the "Prom" episode.

Jessie Précieuse regularly appears, under her real name Alex Verville, as a television meteorologist on MétéoMédia, the French-language version of The Weather Network. In 2021, the network chose to celebrate Pride Month by having Verville present several weather segments in drag as Jessie Précieuse.

Episodes 
<onlyinclude>

References

2022 Canadian television seasons
2022 in LGBT history